John D. Marshall may refer to:

 John Marshall (entrepreneur), American entrepreneur and inventor
 John D. Marshall (American football) (1930–2008), American football and tennis coach, college athletics administrator